Simeon Nenchev Slavchev (born 25 September 1993) is a Bulgarian professional footballer who plays as a defensive midfielder for Wieczysta Kraków.

Slavchev began his professional career at Litex Lovech in 2010. After loan spell at Chavdar Etropole he became a regular in their team. In 2014, he signed for Sporting CP, but failed to break into the first team. After a loan spells with Bolton Wanderers, Apollon Limassol and Lechia Gdańsk, he signed for Qarabağ in 2018.

Career

Early career
Slavchev started his career at home-town club Septemvri Sofia, joining their youth system as a six-year-old. In the 2006–07 season, he became a goalscorer for their youth team. In 2007, Slavchev joined Slavia Sofia and was part of the side that won the Bulgarian U-15 Championship in the 2007–08 season.

Litex Lovech
Slavchev joined the Litex's first team in October 2010. He made his debut during the 2010–11 season, on 31 October 2010 in a 2–0 home win over Slavia Sofia, coming on as a substitute for Hristo Yanev.

In July 2011, Slavchev joined Chavdar Etropole on a season-long loan deal. In the 2011–12 season, he earned 13 appearances in the B PFG(second division of Bulgarian football).

In the summer of 2012, he returned to Litex. On 4 November 2012, in the league match against Cherno More, he marked his first goal in the A PFG in a 4–1 victory.

Sporting CP
On 19 May 2014, Slavchev signed with Portuguese side Sporting CP on a five-year deal, for a reported fee of 2,5 million euro.

Loans to Bolton, Apollon and Lechia
On 2 February 2015 Slavchev joined Bolton Wanderers until the end of the season. He made his debut for the team in the English Championship on 7 February 2015 in a match against Derby County. It was his only match for Bolton after Slavchev got injured and was ruled out until the end of the season.

On 11 August 2015, Slavchev joined the Cypriot team Apollon Limassol on loan for the 2015–16 season. He made his debut on 23 August 2015, scoring the winning goal after added time. On 19 May 2016 Apollon won the Cypriot Cup.

Slavchev had an injury at the end of the 2015–16 season. Sporting decided to loan him out in order for him to gain more experience and to reach full fitness. On 17 August 2016, Slavchev joined Polish club Lechia Gdańsk, on a season-long loan, where he would play alongside fellow Bulgarian footballer, Milen Gamakov. Slavchev made his debut for the team on 9 September 2016, playing the full 90 minutes in a 1–0 win against Cracovia. He scored his first goal for the team on 11 March 2018, in a 1–3 home loss against Legia Warsaw.

Slavchev spent a trial period at Birmingham City during the summer of 2017.

Qarabağ
On 5 July 2018, Slavchev signed a three-year contract with Qarabağ FK.

Levski Sofia
After agreeing to rescind his contract with the Azerbaijani side, Slavchev returned to his home country. On 22 December 2019, he signed a 3-year deal with Levski Sofia. He made his debut on 15 February 2020, in the 0–0 league draw against CSKA Sofia in The Eternal Derby, coming on as an early substitute before being replaced himself towards the end of the match due to injury issues. On 20 June 2020, Slavchev scored his first goal for the club in another Eternal derby that ended 3–3.

Lokomotiv Sofia
In December 2021, Slavchev signed a one-and-a-half year contract with Lokomotiv Sofia.

Wieczysta Kraków
On 3 January 2023, despite efforts from Lechia Gdańsk to re-sign him in the winter transfer window, Slavchev joined Polish fourth division side Wieczysta Kraków on a two-and-a-half year deal, with an extension option.

International career
In September 2009, he was called for Bulgaria U17 by coach Atanas Zhelev and took part in the UEFA U-17 European championship. In 2011, he was called up for the UEFA U-19 European Championship. In 2012, he got his first call-up for the national youth team by coach Mihail Madanski.

In 2013, he was called up for Bulgaria by Lyuboslav Penev for the 2014 World Cup qualification games against Malta and Denmark. On 15 October 2013, in the last match for the qualifications for the 2014 FIFA World Cup against the Czech Republic, he made his debut for the first team as a substitute.

On 25 March 2016, Slavchev came on as a substitute during the magnificent 0-1 away win over Portugal. On 13 November 2016, he played the full 90 minutes in the 1:0 win over Belarus in a 2018 World Cup qualifier.

Statistics

Club

International

Notes

Honours

Club
Qarabağ
 Azerbaijan Premier League: 2018–19

Litex Lovech
 Bulgarian A PFG: 2010–11

Apollon Limassol
 Cypriot Cup: 2015–16

Individual 
 Bulgarian Best Young Player of the Season: 2013
 Lovech sportsman of the year: 2013

References

External links

Simeon Slavchev at theplayersagent.com

Living people
1993 births
Bulgarian footballers
Bulgaria international footballers
Bulgaria under-21 international footballers
Bulgaria youth international footballers
Association football midfielders
PFC Litex Lovech players
FC Chavdar Etropole players
Sporting CP footballers
Bolton Wanderers F.C. players
Apollon Limassol FC players
Lechia Gdańsk players
Qarabağ FK players
PFC Levski Sofia players
FC Lokomotiv 1929 Sofia players
Wieczysta Kraków players
First Professional Football League (Bulgaria) players
English Football League players
Cypriot First Division players
Ekstraklasa players
Azerbaijan Premier League players

Bulgarian expatriate footballers
Bulgarian expatriate sportspeople in Portugal
Bulgarian expatriate sportspeople in Poland
Expatriate footballers in Azerbaijan
Expatriate footballers in Portugal
Expatriate footballers in England
Expatriate footballers in Poland
Expatriate footballers in Cyprus
Bulgarian expatriate sportspeople in Azerbaijan